Mathilde Androuët (born 3 July 1984) is a French politician. She was elected as a National Rally (part of the Identity and Democracy group) Member of the European Parliament (MEP) in the 2019 European parliamentary election.

Early life
Androuët was born on 3 July 1984 in Rueil-Malmaison, Paris, France. Her father Didier Palix was a candidate for National Republican Movement in 2001, and contested the 2015 French departmental elections on behalf of the National Front. She grew up in Chatou and Houilles in the Île-de-France region. Androuët graduated from Sciences Po Aix in Aix-en-Provence. After graduation, she worked for liberal think tank Terra Nova for six months in 2010.

She became a member of the National Front in 2011. In 2014, she became a parliamentary assistant to Florian Philippot. 
Androuët contested the 2017 French legislative election in Yvelines's 11th constituency but finished in 5th place in the first round.

European Parliament
She stood as a National Rally candidate in France in the 2019 European parliamentary election. Androuët was 22nd on her party's list, and was elected as one of its 22 MEPs. She is a member of the Identity and Democracy group. In the European Parliament, she is a member of the Committee on Regional Development.

Notes

References

1984 births
Living people
MEPs for France 2019–2024
21st-century women MEPs for France
National Rally (France) MEPs
National Rally (France) politicians
People from Rueil-Malmaison
Sciences Po Aix alumni
Politicians from Île-de-France